Bait is a 1950 British crime film directed, produced and co-written by Frank Richardson from his own stage play. An Adelphi feature film, Bait stars Diana Napier, John Bentley, Willoughby Goddard and John Oxford. A gang steal some diamonds, sell them on the black market to a buyer and then plan to steal them back again.

Plot
This British  mystery concerns a gang of four jewel thieves, led by Diana Napier, who steal two highly valuable diamonds out of a set of earrings. Napier sells them to a dishonest businessman (Willoughby Goddard) at his country estate, but the gang plans to return later and steal them back. However, Goddard's long-lost half-brother (John Bentley) suddenly returns to the estate accompanied by his new fiancée (Patricia Owens). Bentley wants to claim his half of the inheritance, but soon discovers that his half-brother has squandered the family fortune and is now engaged in buying and selling stolen gems. He confronts Goddard, who panics, and hits Bentley over the head with a poker. As he is about to strike a death blow, a shot rings out and Goddard falls dead. The police arrest Bentley for the murder but soon have to release him for lack of evidence. Meanwhile, Goddard's fiancée tries to find the real killer by playing up to one of the members of the gang, who happens to be an old boyfriend of hers.

Cast
 Diana Napier – Eleanor Parton 
 John Bentley – DuCane 
 John Oxford – Bromley 
 Patricia Owens – Anna Hastings 
 Kenneth Hyde – Jim Prentiss 
 Willoughby Goddard – John Hartley 
 Sheila Robins – Nina Revere

Reception
Hal Erickson writing for AllMovie, noted that: "ladylike Diana Napier is unexpectedly coarse as the female gang boss in Bait." He concluded: "A knuckle tough British programmer, Bait is well acted by all concerned."

References

External links

1950 films
1950 crime films
Films directed by Frank Richardson
British crime films
Films set in London
British black-and-white films
1950s English-language films
1950s British films